The 2021–22 Portland Trail Blazers season was the 52nd season of the franchise in the National Basketball Association (NBA). The Blazers entered the season following a playoff defeat from the Denver Nuggets in the first round of the 2021 NBA playoffs where they lost in six games.

Following the defeat, the Blazers and head coach Terry Stotts mutually agreed to part ways after nine years. Shortly after, the Blazers hired Los Angeles Clippers assistant coach Chauncey Billups to be their head coach.

On August 2, 2021, the Blazers announced coaching staff additions for the 2021–22 season.

After a loss to the San Antonio Spurs on April 1, the Blazers were mathematically eliminated from postseason contention and will miss out on the playoffs for the first time since 2013.

Draft picks

Portland did not hold any picks for the 2021 NBA draft.

Roster

Standings

Division

Conference

Game log

Preseason 

|-style="background:#fcc;"
| 1
| October 4
| Golden State
| 
| Damian Lillard (19)
| Jusuf Nurkić (10)
| Anfernee Simons (6)
| Moda Center13,936
| 0–1
|-style="background:#fcc;"
| 2
| October 12
| Sacramento
| 
| Anfernee Simons (24)
| Greg Brown (9)
| Dennis Smith Jr. (7)
| Moda CenterN/A
| 0–2
|-style="background:#fcc;"
| 3
| October 13
| @ Phoenix
| 
| Damian Lillard (12)
| Jusuf Nurkić (13)
| CJ McCollum (4)
| Footprint Center9,772
| 0–3
|-style="background:#fcc;"
| 3
| October 13
| @ Golden State
| 
| CJ McCollum (26)
| Jusuf Nurkić (10)
| Dennis Smith Jr. (4)
| Chase Center18,064
| 0–4

Regular season 

|-style="background:#fcc;"
| 1
| October 20
| Sacramento
| 
| CJ McCollum (34)
| Jusuf Nurkić (14)
| Damian Lillard (11)
| Moda Center17,467
| 0–1
|-style="background:#cfc;"
| 2
| October 23
| Phoenix
|  
| CJ McCollum (28)
| Jusuf Nurkić (12)
| Damian Lillard (8)
| Moda Center18,558
| 1–1
|-style="background:#fcc;"
| 3
| October 25
| @ L. A. Clippers
| 
| CJ McCollum (20)
| Jusuf Nurkić (12)
| CJ McCollum (4)
| Staples Center15,672
| 1–2
|-style="background:#cfc;"
| 4
| October 27
| Memphis
| 
| CJ McCollum (25)
| Jusuf Nurkić (8)
| Damian Lillard (10)
| Moda Center16,241
| 2–2
|-style="background:#cfc;"
| 5
| October 29
| L. A. Clippers
| 
| Damian Lillard (25)
| Jusuf Nurkić (17)
| Damian Lillard (6)
| Moda Center16,510
| 3–2
|-style="background:#fcc;"
| 6
| October 31
| @ Charlotte
| 
| CJ McCollum (25)
| Jusuf Nurkić (14)
| Damian Lillard (12)
| Spectrum Center14,960
| 3–3

|-style="background:#fcc;"
| 7
| November 1
| @ Philadelphia
| 
| Norman Powell (22)
| Jusuf Nurkić (9)
| Damian Lillard (10)
| Wells Fargo Center20,115
| 3–4
|-style="background:#fcc;"
| 8
| November 3
| @ Cleveland
| 
| Damian Lillard (26)
| Jusuf Nurkić (9)
| Damian Lillard (8)
| Rocket Mortgage FieldHouse16,231
| 3–5
|-style="background:#cfc;"
| 9
| November 5
| Indiana
| 
| CJ McCollum (27)
| Jusuf Nurkić (9)
| Damian Lillard (11)
| Moda Center16,841
| 4–5
|-style="background:#cfc;"
| 10
| November 6
| L.A. Lakers
| 
| Damian Lillard (25)
| Jusuf Nurkić (17)
| Damian Lillard (6)
| Moda Center19,393
| 5–5
|-style="background:#fcc;"
| 11
| November 9
| @ L.A. Clippers
| 
| Damian Lillard (27)
| Jusuf Nurkić (13)
| Covington, Lillard, Nurkić (6)
| Staples Center14,131
| 5–6
|-style="background:#fcc;"
| 12
| November 10
| @ Phoenix
| 
| Damian Lillard (28)
| Lillard, Little (7)
| Lillard, McCollum (7)
| Footprint Center15,672
| 5–7
|-style="background:#cfc;"
| 13
| November 12
| @ Houston
| 
| Damian Lillard (20)
| Nassir Little (14)
| Damian Lillard (7)
| Toyota Center15,468
| 6–7
|-style="background:#fcc;"
| 14
| November 14
| @ Denver
| 
| CJ McCollum (21)
| Nassir Little (7)
| Dennis Smith Jr. (5)
| Ball Arena14,583
| 6–8
|-style="background:#cfc;"
| 15
| November 15
| Toronto
|  
| CJ McCollum (29)
| Jusuf Nurkić (14)
| Damian Lillard (8)
| Moda Center16,142
| 7–8
|-style="background:#cfc;"
| 16
| November 17
| Chicago
| 
| Damian Lillard (22)
| Jusuf Nurkić (12)
| Damian Lillard (10)
| Moda Center17,492
| 8–8
|-style="background:#cfc;"
| 17
| November 20
| Philadelphia
| 
| Damian Lillard (39)
| Jusuf Nurkić (11)
| Damian Lillard (7)
| Moda Center17,027
| 9–8
|-style="background:#cfc;"
| 18
| November 23
| Denver
| 
| CJ McCollum (32)
| Covington, Nurkić (7)
| Damian Lillard (5)
| Moda Center17,052
| 10–8
|-style="background:#fcc;"
| 19
| November 24
| @ Sacramento
| 
| Damian Lillard (32)
| Jusuf Nurkić (17)
| Damian Lillard (10) 
| Golden 1 Center14,997
| 10–9
|-style="background:#fcc;"
| 20
| November 26
| @ Golden State
| 
| Anfernee Simons (19)
| CJ McCollum (7)
| Damian Lillard (6)
| Chase Center18,064
| 10–10
|-style="background:#fcc;"
| 21
| November 29
| @ Utah
| 
| Nurkić, Simons (24)
| Jusuf Nurkić (10)
| CJ McCollum (6)
| Vivint Arena18,306
| 10–11
|-style="background:#cfc;"
| 22
| November 30
| Detroit
| 
| CJ McCollum (28)
| Jusuf Nurkić (8)
| CJ McCollum (6)
| Moda Center16,071
| 11–11

|-style="background:#fcc;"
| 23
| December 2
| San Antonio
| 
| McCollum, Powell 16
| Jusuf Nurkić (7)
| Dennis Smith Jr. (5)
| Moda Center16,143
| 11–12
|-style="background:#fcc;"
| 24
| December 4
| Boston
| 
| CJ McCollum (24)
| Cody Zeller (8)
| McCollum, Smith Jr. (6)
| Moda Center18,193
| 11–13
|-style="background:#fcc;"
| 25
| December 6
| L.A. Clippers
|  
| Jusuf Nurkić (31)
| Robert Covington (10)
| Dennis Smith Jr. (7)
| Moda Center15,865
| 11–14
|-style="background:#fcc;"
| 26
| December 8
| @ Golden State
| 
| Norman Powell (26)
| Jusuf Nurkić (13)
| Jusuf Nurkić (6)
| Chase Center18,064
| 11–15
|-style="background:#fcc;"
| 27
| December 12
| Minnesota
| 
| Anfernee Simons (26)
| Larry Nance Jr. (12)
| Damian Lillard (6)
| Moda Center16,591
| 11–16
|-style="background:#fcc;"
| 28
| December 14
| Phoenix
| 
| Damian Lillard (31)
| Jusuf Nurkić (13)
| Damian Lillard (10)
| Moda Center16,184
| 11–17
|-style="background:#fcc;"
| 29
| December 15
| Memphis
| 
| Norman Powell (25)
| Jusuf Nurkić (12)
| Norman Powell (5)
| Chase Center15,773
| 11–18
|-style="background:#cfc;"
| 30
| December 17
| Charlotte
| 
| Damian Lillard (43)
| Robert Covington (10)
| Damian Lillard (8) 
| Moda Center18,399
| 12–18
|-style="background:#cfc;"
| 31
| December 19
| @ Memphis
| 
| Damian Lillard (32)
| Nance Jr., Nurkić (11)
| Damian Lillard (5) 
| FedEx Forum15,977
| 13–18
|-style="background:#fcc;"
| 32
| December 21
| @ New Orleans
| 
| Damian Lillard (39)
| Larry Nance Jr. (6)
| Damian Lillard (7)
| Smoothie King Center15,272
| 13–19
|-style="background:#bbb;"
| 33
| December 23
| Brooklyn
| —
| colspan="3"|Postponed due to COVID-19 pandemic
| Moda Center
| —
|-style="background:#fcc;"
| 33
| December 27
| Dallas
| 
| Damian Lillard (26)
| Nassir Little (10)
| Damian Lillard (5)
| Moda Center18,430
| 13–20
|-style="background:#fcc;"
| 34
| December 29
| Utah
| 
| Lillard, Powell (32)
| Larry Nance Jr. (9)
| Larry Nance Jr. (9)
| Moda Center17,828
| 13–21
|-
|-style="background:#fcc;"
| 35
| December 31
| @ L.A. Lakers
|  
| Ben McLemore (28)
| Larry Nance Jr. (9)
| Damian Lillard (7)
| Staples Center18,997
| 13–22

|-style="background:#cfc;"
| 36
| January 3
| Atlanta
| 
| Anfernee Simons (43)
| Jusuf Nurkić (12)
| Anfernee Simons (7)
| Moda Center15,091
| 14–22
|-style="background:#fcc;"
| 37
| January 5
| Miami
|  
| Anfernee Simons (28)
| Jusuf Nurkić (13)
| Anfernee Simons (7)
| Moda Center15,773
| 14–23
|-style="background:#fcc;"
| 38
| January 7
| Cleveland
| 
| Norman Powell (19)
| Jusuf Nurkić (12)
| Anfernee Simons (7)
| Moda Center16,708
| 14–24
|-style="background:#cfc;"
| 39
| January 9
| Sacramento
| 
| Anfernee Simons (31) 
| Jusuf Nurkić (16)
| Jusuf Nurkić (9)
| Moda Center16,408
| 15–24
|-style="background:#cfc;"
| 40
| January 10
| Brooklyn
| 
| Anfernee Simons (23) 
| Jusuf Nurkić (8)
| Anfernee Simons (11) 
| Moda Center16,379
| 16–24
|-style="background:#fcc;"
| 41
| January 13
| @ Denver
| 
| Ben McLemore (18)
| Jusuf Nurkić (8)
| Dennis Smith Jr. (8)
| Ball Arena14,972
| 16–25
|-style="background:#cfc;"
| 42
| January 15
| @ Washington
| 
| Anfernee Simons (31)
| Jusuf Nurkić (14)
| Anfernee Simons (11)
| Capital One Arena15,124
| 17–25
|-style="background:#cfc;"
| 43
| January 17
| @ Orlando
| 
| Jusuf Nurkić (21)
| Jusuf Nurkić (22)
| Anfernee Simons (7)
| Amway Center13,648
| 18–25
|-style="background:#fcc;"
| 44
| January 19
| @ Miami
| 
| Anfernee Simons (27)
| Jusuf Nurkić (14)
| Anfernee Simons (7)
| FTX Arena19,600
| 18–26
|-style="background:#cfc;"
| 45
| January 21
| @ Boston
| 
| Jusuf Nurkić (29) 
| Jusuf Nurkić (17) 
| Jusuf Nurkić (6) 
| TD Garden19,156
| 19–26
|-style="background:#cfc;"
| 46
| January 23
| @ Toronto
| 
| Little, McCollum, Simons (19)
| Jusuf Nurkić (11)
| McCollum, Smith Jr. (6)
| Scotiabank Arena0
| 20–26
|-style="background:#fcc;"
| 47
| January 25
| Minnesota
| 
| Little, Nurkić (20)
| Jusuf Nurkić (14)
| Anfernee Simons (7)
| Moda Center16,422
| 20–27
|-style="background:#fcc;"
| 48
| January 26
| Dallas
|  
| Anfernee Simons (23)
| Norman Powell (9)
| Anfernee Simons (7)
| Moda Center16,334
| 20–28
|-style="background:#cfc;"
| 49
| January 28
| @ Houston
| 
| Anfernee Simons (27)
| Jusuf Nurkić (13)
| Anfernee Simons (6)
| Toyota Center16,100
| 21–28
|-style="background:#fcc;"
| 50
| January 30
| @ Chicago
| 
| CJ McCollum (29)
| Robert Covington (7)
| Anfernee Simons (6)
| United Center19,521
| 21–29
|-style="background:#fcc;"
| 51
| January 31
| @ Oklahoma City
| 
| CJ McCollum (21)
| Jusuf Nurkić (9)
| CJ McCollum (7)
| Paycom Center13,812
| 21–30

|-style="background:#fcc;"
| 52
| February 2
| @ L.A. Lakers
| 
| Norman Powell (30)
| Covington, Nurkić (13) 
| Robert Covington (9)
| Staples Center17,259
| 21–31
|-style="background:#fcc;"
| 53
| February 4
| Oklahoma City
| 
| McCollum, Simons (19)
| Jusuf Nurkić (16)
| McCollum, Simons (4)
| Moda Center15,329
| 21–32
|-style="background:#fcc;"
| 54
| February 5
| Milwaukee
| 
| McLemore, Simons (19)
| Jusuf Nurkić (10)
| McCollum, Smith Jr. (6)
| Moda Center19,393
| 21–33
|-style="background:#fcc;"
| 55
| February 8
| Orlando
| 
| Anfernee Simons (19)
| Jusuf Nurkić (11)
| Anfernee Simons (5)
| Moda Center16,024
| 21–34
|-style="background:#cfc;"
| 56
| February 9
| L.A. Lakers
| 
| Anfernee Simons (29)
| Jusuf Nurkić (12)
| Dennis Smith Jr. (11)
| Moda Center19,393
| 22–34
|-style="background:#cfc;"
| 57
| February 12
| New York
| 
| Anfernee Simons (30)
| Jusuf Nurkić (20)
| Anfernee Simons (8)
| Moda Center18,521
| 23–34
|-style="background:#cfc;"
| 58
| February 14
| @ Milwaukee
| 
| Anfernee Simons (31)
| Jusuf Nurkić (16)
| Anfernee Simons (6)
| Fiserv Forum17,341
| 24–34
|-style="background:#cfc;"
| 59
| February 16
| @ Memphis
| 
| Jusuf Nurkić (32)
| Jusuf Nurkić (8)
| Anfernee Simons (6)
| FedEx Forum16,834
| 25–34
|-style="background:#fcc;"
| 60
| February 24
| Golden State
| 
| Anfernee Simons (24)
| Josh Hart (6)
| Josh Hart (4)
| Moda Center19,441
| 25–35 
|-style="background:#fcc;"
| 61
| February 27
| Denver
| 
| Anfernee Simons (16)
| Drew Eubanks (10)
| Brandon Williams (7)
| Moda Center17,771
| 25–36

|-style="background:#fcc;"
| 62
| March 2
| @ Phoenix
| 
| Brandon Williams (14)
| Drew Eubanks (8)
| Simons, Watford (6)
| Footprint Center17,071
| 25–37
|-style="background:#fcc;"
| 63
| March 5
| @ Minnesota
|  
| Anfernee Simons (38)
| Trendon Watford (14)
| Blevins, Johnson (5)
| Target Center17,136
| 25–38
|-style="background:#fcc;"
| 64
| March 7
| @ Minnesota
| 
| Brandon Williams (27)
| Brandon Williams (8)
| Josh Hart (4)
| Target Center16,035
| 25–39
|-style="background:#fcc;"
| 65
| March 9
| @ Utah
| 
| Trendon Watford (22)
| Drew Eubanks (7)
| Keon Johnson (5)
| Vivint Arena18,306
| 25–40
|-style="background:#cfc;"
| 66
| March 12
| Washington
| 
| Josh Hart (44)
| Drew Eubanks (12)
| Josh Hart (6)
| Moda Center17,524
| 26–40
|-style="background:#fcc;"
| 67
| March 14
| @ Atlanta
| 
| Josh Hart (31)
| CJ Elleby (13)
| Brandon Williams (6)
| State Farm Arena16,432
| 26–41
|-style="background:#fcc;"
| 68
| March 16
| @ New York
| 
| Josh Hart (17)
| Drew Eubanks (9)
| Kris Dunn (7)
| Madison Square Garden18,213
| 26–42
|-style="background:#fcc;"
| 69
| March 18
| @ Brooklyn
| 
| Josh Hart (25)
| Eubanks, Williams (6)
| Josh Hart (7)
| Barclays Center17,732
| 26–43
|-style="background:#fcc;"
| 70
| March 20
| @ Indiana
| 
| Josh Hart (26)
| Eubanks, Watford (8)
| Kris Dunn (9)
| Gainbridge Fieldhouse16,067
| 26–44
|-style="background:#cfc;"
| 71
| March 21
| @ Detroit
| 
| Brandon Williams (23)
| Justise Winslow (9)
| Kris Dunn (5)
| Little Caesars Arena14,923
| 27–44
|-style="background:#fcc;"
| 72
| March 23
| San Antonio
| 
| Ben McLemore (23)
| Greg Brown III (14)
| Drew Eubanks (4)
| Moda Center16,610
| 27–45
|-style="background:#fcc;"
| 73
| March 25
| Houston
|  
| Trendon Watford (19)
| CJ Elleby (7)
| Kris Dunn (7)
| Moda Center16,947
| 27–46
|-style="background:#fcc;"
| 74
| March 26
| Houston
| 
| Watford, Williams (15)
| Drew Eubanks (16)
| Brandon Williams (8)
| Moda Center17,821
| 27–47
|-style="background:#fcc;"
| 75
| March 28
| Oklahoma City
| 
| Ben McLemore (28)
| Drew Eubanks (14)
| Brandon Williams (12)
| Moda Center18,188
| 27–48
|-style="background:#fcc;"
| 76
| March 30
| New Orleans
| 
| Drew Eubanks (25)
| Drew Eubanks (9)
| Brandon Williams (10)
| Moda Center18,551
| 27–49

|-style="background:#fcc;"
| 77
| April 1
| @ San Antonio
| 
| Keon Johnson (20)
| Reggie Perry (10)
| Kris Dunn (8)
| AT&T Center17,512
| 27–50
|-style="background:#fcc;"
| 78
| April 3
| @ San Antonio
| 
| Johnson, McLemore (19)
| Drew Eubanks (13)
| Brandon Williams (7)
| AT&T Center15,816
| 27–51
|-style="background:#fcc;"
| 79
| April 5
| @ Oklahoma City
| 
| Keon Johnson (18)
| Kris Dunn (8)
| Kris Dunn (8)
| Paycom Center14,674
| 27–52
|-style="background:#fcc;"
| 80
| April 7
| @ New Orleans
| 
| Drew Eubanks (20)
| Greg Brown III (7)
| Keon Johnson (8)
| Smoothie King Center12,432
| 27–53
|-style="background:#fcc;"
| 81
| April 8
| @ Dallas
| 
| Drew Eubanks (18)
| Elleby, Eubanks (7)
| Keon Johnson (6)
| American Airlines Center20,174
| 27–54
|-style="background:#fcc;"
| 82
| April 10
| Utah
| 
| Reggie Perry (20)
| Reggie Perry (8)
| Keon Johnson (6)
| Moda Center18,123
| 27–55

Transactions

Overview

Trades

Free agency

Re-signed

Additions

Subtractions

Notes

References

Portland Trail Blazers seasons
Portland Trail Blazers
Portland Trail Blazers
Portland Trail Blazers
Portland
Portland